Robert Buron (27 February 1910 – 28 April 1973) was a French politician and Minister of Finance from 20 January 1955 to 23 February 1955 and Minister of Public Works, Transport, and Tourism during Charles de Gaulle's third term from 9 June 1958 to 8 January 1959.

Biography 

Buron was born in 1910 in Paris; he was kidnapped during the 1961 Algiers putsch and in 1965 he founded Objectif 72, a politics-movement. He married Marie-Louise 'Melle' Trouillard (1910-2006) in July 1938, with whom he had a daughter, Martine Buron b.1944, who was a Member of the European Parliament from 1984 until 1994, representing the Parti Socialiste.

In the last years of his life, he was mayor of Laval.

He died in 1973 in Paris. In his honor, the Lycée Robert Buron in Laval was named for him.

Fotogallery

References

Bibliography 
 Marcel Launay, Robert Buron, témoignages de Pierre Pflimlin et Jean Offredo, Paris: Beauchesne, 1993, 208 p. (Politiques & chrétiens).
 Michel Gaignard, "Robert Buron s'implante en Mayenne", L'Oribus, num. 65, March 2006.

External links 

 Atonie politique et "buronisme" en Mayenne

1910 births
1973 deaths
Politicians from Paris
Popular Democratic Party (France) politicians
Popular Republican Movement politicians
Socialist Party (France) politicians
Ministers of Information of France
Transport ministers of France
French Ministers of Overseas France
French Ministers of Finance
Members of the Constituent Assembly of France (1945)
Members of the Constituent Assembly of France (1946)
Deputies of the 1st National Assembly of the French Fourth Republic
Deputies of the 2nd National Assembly of the French Fourth Republic
Deputies of the 3rd National Assembly of the French Fourth Republic
Deputies of the 1st National Assembly of the French Fifth Republic
French people of the Algerian War
Mayors of places in Pays de la Loire